NCRP may refer to one of the following:
National Council on Radiation Protection and Measurements, USA
Network Computer Reference Profile
National Committee for Responsive Philanthropy